John Paul Friar (born 6 June 1963) is a Scottish footballer who played as a left back in the English and Scottish Leagues.

References

External links

1963 births
Living people
Scottish footballers
Footballers from Glasgow
Association football fullbacks
Charlton Athletic F.C. players
Leicester City F.C. players
Rotherham United F.C. players
Motherwell F.C. players
Northampton Town F.C. players
Aldershot F.C. players
Welling United F.C. players
Dartford F.C. players
Enfield F.C. players
Fisher Athletic F.C. players
Partick Thistle F.C. players
East Stirlingshire F.C. players
Albion Rovers F.C. players
English Football League players
Scottish Football League players
Fauldhouse United F.C. players
Scotland youth international footballers
Scottish Junior Football Association players